is a 2011 Japanese film directed by Sion Sono.

The film consists of two versions: an International Cut, spanning 113 minutes, and an original Japanese Cut, spanning 144 minutes. The latter is currently unavailable outside of Japan, France, Germany, and the United States. The movie was inspired by Murder of Yasuko Watanabe, which occurred on March 9, 1997.

Plot
A grisly murder occurs in Maruyama-cho, Shibuya, Tokyo – a love hotel district – where a woman is found dead in a derelict apartment. As the police investigate, the story interweaves with that of Izumi, the wife of a famous romantic novelist whose life seems just a daily repetition without romance. One day, to break away from the loveless monotony, she decides to follow her desires and accepts a job as a nude model enacting sex in front of the camera. Soon she meets with a mentor and starts selling her body to strangers, while at home she hides behind the facade that she is still the wife she is supposed to be.

Cast
 Miki Mizuno – Kazuko
 Makoto Togashi – Mitsuko
 Megumi Kagurazaka – Izumi

References

External links
 
 Review  at Twitch Film
 Review at Variety

2011 films
Films directed by Sion Sono
Erotic romance films
Japanese crime films
Japanese erotic films
Japanese horror drama films
2010s Japanese films